Schocalog Run is a stream located entirely within Summit County, Ohio.

Schocalog most likely is a Native American word of unknown meaning.

See also
List of rivers of Ohio

References

Rivers of Summit County, Ohio
Rivers of Ohio